Sagerton is an unincorporated community in Haskell County, Texas, United States.

History
According to the Handbook of Texas, the community was established in 1905 and named for W. M. Sager, the townsite donor. It was a shipping point for locally grown agricultural products such as cotton, cattle, and poultry on the newly constructed . Beginning in 1909, the Stamford and Northwestern Railway, stretching from Stamford to Spur, also provided rail service. Fires in 1917 and 1926 caused extensive property damage, and the town's bank, organized in 1908, failed in 1931.

Geography
The Double Mountain Fork and the Salt Fork merge to form the Brazos River (proper) just  to the north of Sagerton.

Population
Sagerton was never a large town.  The population rose to 300 in 1940 and fell to 115 in 1980.  According to the 2000 Census, the estimated population of Sagerton has remained at around 115 residents.

References

External links

Unincorporated communities in Haskell County, Texas
Unincorporated communities in Texas